Khoya Khoya Chand, (translation: Lost Moon) is an Indian Hindi film directed by Sudhir Mishra which released on 7 December 2007. The film stars Shiney Ahuja and Soha Ali Khan with Rajat Kapoor, Sushmita Mukherjee, Sonya Jehan and Vinay Pathak in important roles. The film captures the lifestyle of celebrities with aplomb with the 1950s film industry as its backdrop.

It was produced by Prakash Jha and Alankrita Shrivastava was involved in the production.

Cast 
 Shiney Ahuja as Zafar
 Soha Ali Khan as Nikhat
 Rajat Kapoor as Prem Kumar
 Sonya Jehan as Ratanbala
 Sushmita Mukherjee as Sharda
 Vinay Pathak as Shaymol
 Mahie Gill as Starlet at Prem's house
 Pappu Polyester
 Anangsha Biswas

Music 
The soundtrack of the film was released on 8 November 2007; composed by Shantanu Moitra, with lyrics by Swanand Kirkire.

Critical reception
Khalid Mohamed of Hindustan Times gave the film 2.5 out of 5 stars, writing ″Like it or not, Soha Ali Khan is hopelessly miscast.The role required at least one per cent of what Smita Patil gave to Bhumika. Ms Khan may be sincere but not mature enough to make you care about this Soya Soya Chand.″ Taran Adarsh of IndiaFM gave the film 1.5 stars out of 5, writing ″On the whole, KHOYA KHOYA CHAND has some interesting moments, but the impact it ought to create as also its slow pacing and excessive length dilute the effect.″

References

External links
 

2000s Hindi-language films
2007 films
Films scored by Shantanu Moitra
Films set in the 1950s
Films about filmmaking
2007 drama films